Highmore is a surname. Notable people with the surname include:

Anthony Highmore (1719–1799), English artist
Anthony Highmore (legal writer) (1758–1829), English legal writer
Edward Highmore (born 1961), English actor
Freddie Highmore (born 1992), English actor
Joseph Highmore (1692–1780), British painter
Matthew Highmore (born 1996), Canadian ice hockey player 
Nathaniel Highmore (surgeon) (1613–1685), British surgeon
Sir Nathaniel Highmore (barrister) (1844–1924), British civil servant and barrister
Susanna Highmore (1690–1750), British poet
Thomas Highmore (1660–1720), British painter

See also
Highmore, South Dakota, US
Highmoor (disambiguation)